The 2002 Missouri Tigers football team represented the University of Missouri during the 2002 NCAA Division I-A football season.  They played their home games at Faurot Field in Columbia, Missouri.  They were members of the Big 12 Conference in the North Division.  The team was coached by head coach Gary Pinkel.

Schedule

Roster

References

Missouri
Missouri Tigers football seasons
Missouri Tigers football